Acalolepta sobria is a species of beetle in the family Cerambycidae. It was described by Francis Polkinghorne Pascoe in 1858. 
It is known from Borneo.

References

Acalolepta
Beetles described in 1858
Taxa named by Francis Polkinghorne Pascoe